RAF Bridleway Gate is a former Royal Air Force satellite airfield located in Shropshire.

The following units were here at some point:
 No. 2 Maintenance Unit RAF
 No. 11 (Pilots) Advanced Flying Unit RAF
 No. 11 Service Flying Training School RAF
 No. 245 Maintenance Unit RAF

References

Royal Air Force stations in Shropshire